Accumulative roll bonding (ARB) is a severe plastic deformation (SPD) process. It is a method of rolling a stack of metal sheets, which are repeatedly rolled to a severe reduction ratio, sectioned into two halves, piled again and rolled. It has been often proposed as a method for the production of metal materials with ultrafine grain microstructure. The earliest works on ARB were by Nobuhiro Tsuji, Y. Saito and co-workers. To obtain a single slab of a solid material, the rolling involves not only deformation, but also roll bonding.

References

Industrial processes
Joining
Metalworking
Metal forming